Muscimol (also known as agarin or pantherine) is one of the principal psychoactive constituents of Amanita muscaria and related species of mushroom. Muscimol is a potent and selective orthosteric agonist for the GABAA receptors  and displays sedative-hypnotic, depressant and hallucinogenic psychoactivity.  This colorless or white solid is classified as an isoxazole.

Muscimol went under clinical trial phase I for epilepsy,  but the trial was discontinued.

Biochemistry
Muscimol is one of the psychoactive compounds responsible for the effects of Amanita muscaria intoxication. Ibotenic acid, a neurotoxic secondary metabolite of Amanita muscaria, serves as a prodrug to muscimol when the mushroom is ingested or dried, converting to muscimol via decarboxylation.

Muscimol is produced in the mushrooms Amanita muscaria (fly agaric) and Amanita pantherina, along with muscarine (which is present in trace amounts and it is not active), muscazone, and ibotenic acid. A. muscaria and A. pantherina should be eaten with caution and prepared properly to lessen effects of nausea. In A. muscaria, the layer just below the skin of the cap contains the highest amount of muscimol, and is therefore the most psychoactive portion.

Pharmacology 

Muscimol is a potent GABAA agonist, activating the receptor for the brain's principal inhibitory neurotransmitter, GABA. Muscimol binds to the same site on the GABAA receptor complex as GABA itself, as opposed to other GABAergic drugs such as barbiturates and benzodiazepines which bind to separate regulatory sites. GABAA receptors are widely distributed in the brain, and so when muscimol is administered, it alters neuronal activity in multiple regions including the cerebral cortex, hippocampus, and cerebellum. While muscimol is normally thought of as a selective GABAA agonist with exceptionally high affinity to GABAA-delta  receptors, it is also a partial agonist at the GABAA-rho receptor, and so its range of effects results from a combined action on more than one GABAA receptor subtype.

The psychoactive dose of muscimol is around 10–15 mg for an average person. A Guide to British Psilocybin Mushrooms by Richard Cooper published in 1977 recommends a smaller dose, 8.5 mg, and suggests that it is possible for this amount to be present in as little as 1 g of dried A. muscaria but this is not consistent with most other reports which suggest 5–10 g is necessary. A correct dose may be difficult to determine because potency varies dramatically from one mushroom to the next.
 
When consumed, a substantial percentage of muscimol goes un-metabolized and thus excreted in urine, a phenomenon exploited by practitioners of the traditional entheogenic use of Amanita muscaria.

In patients with Huntington's disease and chronic schizophrenia, oral doses of muscimol have been found to cause a rise of both prolactin and growth hormone.

During a test involving rabbits connected to an EEG, muscimol presented with a distinctly synchronized EEG tracing.  This is substantially different from serotonergic psychedelics, with which brainwave patterns generally show a desynchronization. In higher doses (2 mg/kg via IV), the EEG will show characteristic spikes.

Effects
The effects of muscimol begin around one hour after consumption, peaking at 3 hours, and lasting a total of 10–24 hours. These include euphoria, dream-like (lucid) state of mind, out-of-body experiences and synesthesia. Negative effects include mild to moderate nausea, stomach discomfort, increased salivation and muscle twitching or tremors. In large doses strong dissociation or delirium may be felt.

Many of muscimol's effects are consistent with its pharmacology as a GABAA receptor agonist, presenting many depressant or sedative-hypnotic effects. Atypical of the effect profile of sedative drugs generally however, muscimol, like Z-drugs, can cause hallucinogenic changes in perception. The hallucinogenic effect produced by muscimol is most closely comparable to the hallucinogenic/Lilliputian side effects produced by some other GABAergic drugs such as zolpidem.

Chemistry

Structure 
Muscimol was first isolated from Amanita pantherina by Onda in 1964, and thought to be an amino acid or peptide.  Structure was then elucidated by Takemoto, Eugster, and Bowden.  Muscimol is a semi-rigid isoxazole containing both alcohol and aminomethyl substituents.  Muscimol is commonly portrayed as a tautomer, where it adopts an amide-like configuration.  It is also commonly shown as a zwitterion.

Isolation
Muscimol can be extracted from the flesh of the Amanita muscaria by treatment with boiling water, followed by rapid cooling, and further treatment with a basic resin.  This is washed with water, and eluted with acetic acid using column chromatography.  The eluate is freeze dried, dissolved in water, and passed down a column of cellulose phosphate.  A subsequent elution with ammonium hydroxide and recrystallization from alcohol results in pure muscimol.

In instances where pure muscimol is not required, such as recreational or spiritual use, a crude extract is often prepared by simmering dried Amanita muscaria in water for thirty minutes.

Chemical Synthesis
Muscimol was synthesized in 1965 by Gagneux, who utilized a bromo-isoxazole starting material in a two step reaction.  3-bromo-5-aminomethyl-isoxazole (1) was refluxed in a mixture of Methanol and Potassium Hydroxide for 30 hours, resulting in 3-methoxy-5-aminomethyl-isoxazole (2) with a yield of 60%. 

(2) was then refluxed in concentrated hydrochloric acid to hydrolyze the methoxy group, and the zwitterion crystallized from a solution of methanol and tetrahydrofuran after the addition of triethylamine, resulting in a 50% yield.

Chemists report having struggled to reproduce these results. More dependable and scalable procedures have been developed, two examples being the syntheses of McCarry and Varasi.

McCarry's synthesis is a three step synthesis involving a lithium acetylide produced from propargyl chloride.  The acetylide (3), was dissolved in ether, cooled to -40 °C, and treated with excess ethyl chloroformate to afford ethyl 4-chlorotetrolate (4) in a 70% yield. (4) was then added to a solution of water, methanol and hydroxylamine at -35 °C.  At a pH of between 8.5 and 9, the isoxazole (5) was recovered in a 41% yield.  Muscimol was formed in a 65% yield when (5) was dissolved in a saturated solution of methanol and anhydrous ammonia and heated from 0 °C to 50 °C.  The total yield was 18.7%.

Varasi's synthesis is notable for its inexpensive starting materials and mild conditions.  It begins with the combination of 2,3-Dichloro-1-propene (6), potassium bicarbonate, water, and dibromoformaldoxime (7), all dissolved in ethyl acetate.  5-Chloromethyl-3-bromoisoxazole (8) was extracted with an experimental yield of 81%. 5-Aminomethyl-3-bromoisoxazole (9) was formed in 90% yield by the combination of (8) and ammonium hydroxide in dioxane. 

(9) was then refluxed with potassium hydroxide in methanol to generate 5-Aminomethyl-3-methoxyisoxazole (10) with a 66% yield.  Subsequent reflux of (10) with hydrobromic acid and acetic acid generated muscimol with a yield of 62%.  The overall synthetic yield was 30%.

Toxicity 
The median lethal dose in mice is 3.8 mg/kg s.c, 2.5 mg/kg i.p.  The LD50 in rats is 4.5 mg/kg i.v, 45 mg/kg orally.

Human deaths are rare, mainly occurring in young children, the elderly, or those with serious chronic illnesses.

Legal status

Australia 
Muscimol is considered a Schedule 9 prohibited substance in Australia under the Poisons Standard (October 2015). A Schedule 9 substance is a substance "which may be abused or misused, the manufacture, possession, sale or use of which should be prohibited by law except when required for medical or scientific research, or for analytical, teaching or training purposes with approval of Commonwealth and/or State or Territory Health Authorities."

United States
Neither Amanita muscaria nor muscimol is considered a controlled substance by the Federal government of the United States.  This means that cultivation, possession, and distribution are unregulated by the United States Federal Government.

Muscimol may be regulated on a state level.  Louisiana State Act 159 banned the possession and cultivation of the Amanita muscaria except for ornamental or aesthetic purposes.  This act outlaws preparations of the Amanita muscaria intended for human consumption, including muscimol.

See also 

 Ibotenic acid
 Gaboxadol
 Thiomuscimol
 CI-966
 Z-drugs

References

External links 
Psychoactive Amanitas on Erowid

Entheogens
GABAA receptor agonists
GABAA-rho receptor agonists
Isoxazoles
Mycotoxins
Oneirogens
Sedatives
Amines
Alkaloids
Anticonvulsants
Enols